Neumayr is a surname. Notable people with the surname include:

Franz Neumayr (1697–1765), German Jesuit theologian
Markus Neumayr (born 1986), German-Swiss footballer
Mary Neumayr (born 1964), American government official
Melchior Neumayr (1845–1890), Austrian palaeontologist